Harvington is a village near Evesham in Worcestershire, England. Bounded by the River Avon to the south and the Lench Hills to the north, three miles northeast of Evesham and now on the Worcestershire/Warwickshire border. The village today is an amalgamation of two smaller villages, Harvington and Harvington Cross, and has a population of around 1,750.

Past

Harvington is first mentioned in the Anglo Saxon charters of 709CE when it was known as Herverton; in the Middle Ages it was called Herwynton. In 1868 there was a curious old custom still observed at Harvington; the children used to go round to all the houses on St Thomas's Day and St Valentine's Day repeating a doggerel rhyme as follows:
'Wissal, wassail, through the town,
If you've got any apples throw them down,
Up with the stocking and down with the shoe,
If you've got no apples money will do.'

Present
Harvington has a number of amenities including a convenience store, a farm shop, two children's play areas, a community orchard, active youth group, sports facilities and clubs.

There are two churches, the Anglican St James Church and a Baptist church.

The village is graced with two pubs, the Golden Cross and the Coach and Horses.

The River Avon is close by and is very popular with local fishermen. A large section of the bank is owned and managed by Manor Farm Leisure, which also runs the local golf course, fishing lakes and holiday caravan site.

Harvington Hall, a part medieval manor house, stands in the village, and is open to the public. Note: Harvington Hall is not in this particular village. As noted below it is in Harvington, Kidderminster DY10 4LR. The Harvington in this article is WR11 4NZ.

Education
Harvington First School is a small school of approximately 100 pupils aged 5 – 10 years. Older pupils attend nearby St. Egwins Middle School and Prince Henry's High School which are in Evesham.
Harvey Bears Nursery & Preschool offers childcare to the residents of Harvington and surrounding communities.

Sports
Harvington Cricket Club. Winners of 4 Worcestershire league titles which they achieved in 2009, 2010, 2011 and 2013. The club has enjoyed some of its most successful seasons in recent years and are currently residing in Division 5 of the Worcestershire County League where they aim for their fifth league title. The club also hosts county matches at various representative levels. In 2010 1st XI player Nathan Gage won the prestigious Worcestershire Cricketer of the Year sponsored by Duncan Fearnley and the Worcester News. The club runs free coaching sessions for local schools and holds Junior practice on Friday evenings.

Harvington Harriers Football club. Currently playing in division 3 in the Evesham & District Sunday Football League.

Railways
Harvington railway station previously served the village as part of the Gloucester Loop Line. The Redditch Railway opened on 18 September 1859 but was operated from the start by the Midland Railway.

There were intermediate stations between Redditch and Evesham at Studley and Astwood Bank, Coughton,  (for the Stratford-upon-Avon and Midland Junction Railway), and Harvington.

British Railways (BR) closed the line under the Beeching Axe south of Alcester on 29 September 1962 after suspending the passenger service between Redditch and Evesham due to poor track condition. Freight services continued between Redditch and Alcester until 1964 when BR closed the whole line south of Redditch.

Governance & religion
Harvington parish is within the Wychavon District ward of Harvington and Norton, the Worcestershire County division of Harvington, and the parliamentary constituency of Mid Worcestershire whose MP since 2015 is Nigel Huddleston of the Conservative Party.

It is within the Church of England Diocese of Worcester, the Archdeaconry of Worcester, and the deanery of Evesham; and the Roman Catholic province of Birmingham, the Archdiocese of Birmingham, and the deanery of Worcester.

Notable residents
 Adam de Harvington, Chancellor of the Exchequer 1327–1330, took his surname from his native village. He was usually known in his own lifetime as Adam de Herwynton (the common medieval spelling of Harvington). Note: Again, he was born in Harvington, Kidderminster, not Harvington, Evesham.
  William de Harvington, who was Adam's cousin and left him his personal property, was Abbot of Pershore Abbey 1307–1340.

External links

British History Online : Harvington

Villages in Worcestershire